Thirteen ships of the French Navy have been named in honour of Louis Antoine de Bougainville:
 A privateer captured by the frigate  in June 1801
 A brig captured by the British in 1809
 A brig-aviso (1830–1856)
 A steam aviso (1858–1889)
 An aviso (1875–1920), launched as Allier and renamed in 1887
 A three-masted barque (1902), sunk by a German submarine in 1916
 A mobilised cargo (1914), captured by the Japanese in 1942
 A colonial aviso  (1929–1940)
 An auxiliary cruiser (ex-Victor Schoelcher) sunk by the British in 1942
 The landing ship dock  (1986)
 The present , a D'Entrecasteaux-class multi-mission vessel

See also
  of the French Navy

French Navy ship names